Standing stock may refer to:

 Biomass (ecology) of a stock of organisms
 Population density, a measurement of population per unit area or unit volume
 Livestock crush, British English for the device called a stock or standing stock in the USA, used for restraining livestock

See also
 Stock (disambiguation)